Gladiovalva rumicivorella is a moth of the family Gelechiidae. It was described by Pierre Millière in 1881. It is found in Spain, France, Germany, Switzerland and Italy.

References

Moths described in 1881
Gladiovalva